The International Union of Railways groups all special classes of railway goods wagon (less those in classes F, H, L, S or Z) into Class U in its goods wagon classification system.

These are:
 Bulk goods wagons for transporting powders, etc.
 Dual coupling wagons for joining wagons with different coupling systems
 Barrier vehicles for joining wagons with different coupling systems  
 Well wagons including low deck wagons Schnabel wagons
 Self-discharging  hoppers with loading hatches
 Trials vehicles for RoadRailer and Kombirail systems for intermodal transport.

Between 1964 and 1979 bulk goods wagons for liquid and gaseous materials (tank wagons) were included in Class U before being reclassified in 1980 as Class Z.

Bulk goods wagons for transporting powders (powder wagons) 

The powder wagon is a special form of bulk goods wagon designed to transport goods in powder form. These wagons are pneumatically unloaded, usually by using compressed air. For goods that might react with oxygen in the compressed air, nitrogen is used instead. These wagons are used for bulk commodities, such as cement, that are so fine-grained they cannot be poured, or at least do not pour very well, and so cannot be emptied under gravity. Under the UIC system they are given the category letter U and index letter c. They do not normally have their own compressors but must be unloaded using external equipment.

Intermodal container well wagons

Special low deck wagons 

This group has a large variety of different types of wagon that range from the two-axle low deck wagon to the 36-axle Schnabel wagon.

The current designation for all low deck wagons is Ui, which can be supplemented as necessary by the index letters a, aa, k, kk or s. The load limits on low-loading wagons are not indicated by letters. The former German wagon classes were St and SSt.

In 1998 the Deutsche Bahn had a total of 180 well wagons of 43 different types. They are used to move very large and heavy goods that would exceed the loading gauge on flat wagons. Such loads typically include: combine harvesters, generators or narrow gauge vehicles.

List of selected low deck wagons

Schnabel wagons 

The largest low-loading wagons are designed as Schnabel wagons, made from two completely separate sections. Each section rests on multiple-axle bogies or groups of bogies. The two sections each support a beak-shaped carrying arm which, in turn, supports one side of a low-loading platform or is directly fixed to the outsize load to be transported. In the latter case the load becomes temporarily part of the vehicle itself. The wagons have hydraulic equipment with which the load can be raised or lowered in order to manoeuvre it past obstacles. There are about 30 examples of Schnabel wagon in Europe, North America and Asia.

Typical loads for these vehicles are large boilers for power stations, turbine components or power station transformers. Due to their heavy weight and outsize dimensions these goods are not usually transported in normal goods trains, but are moved in special trains and need careful preparation. Whenever transportation restrictions arise with a wagon and its load due to its weight and size, it is designated as an abnormal load and must be labelled in accordance with the RIV as a U type. When the vehicle is unladen the two carrying arms are joined directly to one another; the wagon can then travel in goods trains at normal speeds.

Hopper wagons with loading hatches 

A range of funnel-shaped self-discharging wagons is also classed as special wagons. Their external shape resembles the open hoppers, but they have an enclosed roof with loading hatches or in some other way do not fulfil the criteria for a wagon with opening roof.

The DB has grouped several of the lime wagons with four hatches taken over from the DR into Class Uaoos-y. Some of these wagons have since been fitted with swing roofs.

In the SNCF there is a large number of grain wagons in service that are classed as special wagons.

See also 
 Lowmac
 Open wagon
 Well car

References

Literature and media 

Stefan Carstens: Die Güterwagen der DB AG. MIBA, Nürnberg 1998, 

Freight rolling stock
International Union of Railways
International rail transport